Jackson is an 'L' station on the CTA's Blue Line, located in the Loop. This station was recently renovated to resemble the Jackson/State station; a pedestrian tunnel connects these two stations, allowing for a free transfer to the Red Line. Farecard transfers to the  station are also available at this station for the Brown, Orange, Pink, and Purple Lines.

This is the southernmost of the three stations on one long continuous platform underneath Dearborn Street, with the stops at Monroe and Washington being the other two.

Bus connections
CTA
  1 Bronzeville/Union Station (Weekday Rush Hours only) 
  7 Harrison 
  22 Clark (Owl Service) 
  24 Wentworth (Weekdays only) 
  28 Stony Island (Weekday Rush Hours only) 
  36 Broadway 
  62 Archer (Owl Service) 
  126 Jackson 
  130 Museum Campus (Memorial Day-Labor Day Only) 
  146 Inner Lake Shore/Michigan Express 
  151 Sheridan

Notes and references

Notes

References

External links 

Jackson/Dearborn at Chicago-L.org
Van Buren Street/Jackson Boulevard entrance from Google Maps Street View
Adams Street/Jackson Boulevard entrance from Google Maps Street View

CTA Blue Line stations
Railway stations in the United States opened in 1951